Mark Waite is an English retired football midfielder who has spent his entire playing and coaching career in the United States. He is the son of John Waite.

Player
Waite attended Lock Haven University, playing on the men's soccer team from 1990 to 1993. He was a 1992 NCAA Division II First Team All American and holds the school's career goals record with fifty-seven and the career assists record with thirty-three.

External links
 Old Dominion coach bio

References

Living people
Footballers from Grimsby
American Professional Soccer League players
English footballers
English expatriate footballers
Virginia Beach Mariners players
Hershey Wildcats players
USISL players
Association football midfielders
Expatriate soccer players in the United States
English football managers
English expatriate sportspeople in the United States
Year of birth missing (living people)